Gilbert Achcar ( 5 November 1951) is a Lebanese socialist academic and writer. He is a Professor of Development Studies and International Relations at the School of Oriental and African Studies of the University of London. 

His research interests cover the Near East and North Africa, the foreign policy of the United States, Globalization, Islam, and Islamic fundamentalism. 

He is also a Fellow at the International Institute for Research and Education.

Career
Born in Senegal, Achcar was raised in Lebanon where he obtained degrees in philosophy and the social sciences at the Lebanese University and was a member of the Revolutionary Communist Group. He took up residence in France in 1983, and completed his doctorate in social history and international relations  at the University of Paris VIII, where, in 1991, he began teaching political science, sociology and international relations. In 2003 he took up a research position at the Marc Bloch Centre in Berlin, which he maintained until he assumed a professorship at SOAS.

The Arabs and the Holocaust

Achcar's The Arabs and the Holocaust, published in 2010, analyzes the collaboration between Arab leaders and the Nazis and the impact of those relationships on modern Arab-Israeli relationships, and, according to Tariq Ali, it dismantles in a scholarly way the simplistic myths that emerged in the wake of the establishment of the State of Israel. In the book,  Achcar argues that it is ironic Israel preferred to deal with a "notorious Jew-hater" like Anwar Sadat, who regarded Jews as a "treacherous people", instead of Gamal Abdel Nasser, and it preferred Mahmoud Abbas to Yasser Arafat, though aware of the former's remarks on the Holocaust, and he questions'Is it an accident that Israel's rulers chose to sign treaties with Anwar Sadat rather than Nasser, and preferred Abbas over Arafat? Or is it a sign of elective affinities between Jew haters and Arab haters, whose vision of the world is the same, only stood on its head?'
"Statist Zionism is a Janus," Achcar adds, with "one face towards the Holocaust, the other toward the Nakba," in that it faces not only the persecutions suffered in the Holocaust but also the subsequent oppression it has inflicted on Palestinians. Achcar concludes that genuine dialogue can only arise if both realities are confronted.

According to Tony Greenstein, writing in Holy Land Studies, the book is "based on a considerable body of research" and strongest point is its treatment of the understanding of the Holocaust in Arab society. Greenstein argues that Achcar sometimes engages in special pleading in favor of Zionism. In Race & Class, Ralph M. Coury describes the book as magisterial in its "ability to integrate a story of Arab intellectual and political diversity with the story of how this diversity has often been reduced to a monolithic caricature", but he suggests that the author may overstate the role of narratives. Anaheed Al-Hardan, in British Journal of Middle Eastern Studies, described the book as "a powerful and nuanced indictment of what is an essentialising and demonising discourse on the Arabs and the Holocaust".

The Arabs and the Holocaust was reviewed unfavorably by Jeffrey Herf, who wrote in The New Republic that the book undermines its virtues with "superficial, unfair, and unreliable readings of those with whom he disagrees" and that such attacks do not contribute to scholarship. Matthias Küntzel of the Canadian Institute for the Study of Antisemitism, described the book as one "in which an author from the political left seeks to protect the dogmas of Western anti-Zionism from the reality of Arab antisemitism." Writing for Mondoweiss, Miriyam Aouragh reviewed it positively, calling it "a reasoned intervention that at once disputes anti-Arab racism and develops a strong set of arguments against the notion 'Arab anti-Semitism'."

Bibliography 

 Author: La nouvelle Guerre froide : le monde après le Kosovo, 1999. English translation included as two chapters in Tariq Ali (ed.): "Masters of the Universe". NATO’s Balkan Crusade, 2000".
 Editor: The Legacy of Ernest Mandel, 1999.
 Author: Eastern Cauldron: Islam, Afghanistan, Palestine and Iraq in a Marxist Mirror, 2004 (L'Orient incandescent : le Moyen-Orient au miroir marxiste, 2003.
 Author The Clash of Barbarisms: The Making of the New World Disorder (Le choc des barbaries : terrorismes et désordre mondial, 2002 and 2006.
 Editor: The Israeli Dilemma: A Debate between Two Left-Wing Jews. Letters between Marcel Liebman and Ralph Miliband (Le dilemme israélien. Un débat entre Juifs de gauche), 2006.
 Author with Michel Warschawski: The 33-Day War: Israel’s War on Hezbollah in Lebanon and its Consequences, 2007.
 Author with Noam Chomsky,  Perilous Power. The Middle East and U.S. Foreign Policy,, (2007/2008) rev.ed. Routledge, 2015.
 Author: The Arabs and the Holocaust, 2010.
 Author:  The People Want: A Radical Exploration of the Arab Uprising, (trans.) University of California Press, 2012.
 Author:  Marxism, Orientalism, Cosmopolitanism, Haymarket Books, 2013.
 Author: Morbid Symptoms: Relapse in the Arab Uprising, Stanford University Press, 2016.

References

External links
 Profile at School of Oriental and African Studies

Lebanese emigrants to France
Living people
1951 births
Paris 8 University Vincennes-Saint-Denis alumni
Academics of SOAS University of London
Trotskyists